Bootlegger's Daughter is a book written by Margaret Maron and published by Mysterious Press on 1 May 1992 which later went on to win the Anthony Award for Best Novel in 1993. It was also awarded the 1993 Edgar Award for Best Novel.

References 

Anthony Award-winning works
American mystery novels
1992 American novels
Edgar Award-winning works
Mysterious Press books